NGC 53 is a ringed barred spiral galaxy in the constellation Tucana. It was discovered by John Herschel on 15 September 1836. He described it as "very faint, small, extended". The galaxy is approximately 120,000 light-years across, making it about as large as the Milky Way.

See also 
 List of NGC objects (1–1000)

References

External links 
 
 
 SEDS

0053
00982
NGC 0053
IRAS catalogue objects
18360915
Discoveries by John Herschel
Tucana (constellation)